Monh Saphan is a Cambodian politician. He belongs to Funcinpec and was elected to represent Kampong Cham Province in the National Assembly of Cambodia in 2003.

References

Members of the National Assembly (Cambodia)
FUNCINPEC politicians
Living people
Year of birth missing (living people)